Gerontius of Cervia (Gerontius of Ficocle) (died 501 AD) was an Italian bishop of Cervia who is venerated as a saint.

Life
The first known Bishop of Cervia is Gerontius. He was returning with Viticanus, Bishop of Cagli, from the Roman council held in 501 to treat accusations made against Pope Symmachus, when he was assaulted and killed by bandits on the Via Flaminia at Cagli, near Ancona. (The legend says "heretics", perhaps Goths, or more probably Heruli, of the army of Odoacer.) His relics are venerated at Cagli.

He was venerated as a martyr.  His feast day is May 9.

References

Bishops in Emilia-Romagna
People from the Province of Ravenna
Medieval Italian saints
501 deaths
6th-century Christian saints
6th-century Italian bishops
Year of birth unknown